SBV may refer to:

 Pentavalent antimonial, abbreviated SbV; class of compounds
 Schmallenberg virus, a virus that causes birth defects in sheep, cattle and goats
 State Bank of Victoria
 SBV Vitesse Arnhem, football club
 sbv, ISO-639 abbreviation for the Sabine language
 SBV functions, class of mathematical functions; see Bounded variation#SBV functions
 SBV, the National Rail station code for St Budeaux Victoria Road railway station, Devon, England